Dating in the Dark Australia premiered on the Fox8 subscription television on 1 December 2010. The show's format is based on a Dutch dating show called Daten in het Donker. The series is hosted by Laura Dundovic. A second season premiered on 10 April 2012.

The premise of the show involves three single guys and three single girls who are brought together in one house. They only come into contact with the opposite sex in a dark room, with high definition night vision cameras capturing their meetings.  The contestants are encouraged to touch each other to see if they like the physical body of the person they may go on a romantic date with.

References

External links 
 Official website

Fox8 original programming
2010 Australian television series debuts
2012 Australian television series endings
Australian dating and relationship reality television series
2010s Australian reality television series
2010s Australian game shows
English-language television shows